Kozloduy Island (ostrov Kozloduy) is the second largest Bulgarian Danubian island (after Belene Island). Located opposite the town of Kozloduy, it is 7.5 km in length and between 0.5 and 1.6 km in width, with an area of 6.1 km2.

The island raises 3-4 metre above the river and the flora consists of river poplar trees. Birds known to nest on the island include wild geese and wild ducks.

As the distance from the bank is 200 m, the island is only accessible by boat.

References
 

River islands of Bulgaria
Landforms of Vratsa Province
Islands of the Danube